Wolfgang Seel (born 21 June 1948) is a German former footballer. He spent 12 seasons in the Bundesliga with 1. FC Kaiserslautern, Fortuna Düsseldorf and 1. FC Saarbrücken. He represented Germany 6 times, including a UEFA Euro 1976 qualifier against Bulgaria and 5 friendlies.

In the 1979 DFB-Pokal Final, played on 23 June in Hanover against Hertha BSC, Seel scored the winning goal in Fortuna's 1–0 victory in the 116th minute. Seel intercepted a pass a Berlin defender had played back to his own goalkeeper, Norbert , swerved around the lunging goaltender and scored with just four minutes to play in extra time. Under the rules in place at that time, had the game ended in a draw it would have been replayed several days later. Seel's goal earned Fortuna their first-ever Cup and made him a hero in Düsseldorf.

Wolfgang Seel also scored twice in Fortuna Düsseldorf's historic 7–1 win over FC Bayern München in the 1978/79 season, one of Fortuna Düsseldorf's highest-ever victories and one of the worst defeats in FC Bayern's history.

Honours
 UEFA Cup Winners' Cup finalist: 1979.
 Bundesliga 3rd place: 1974.
 DFB-Pokal winner: 1979, 1980.
 DFB-Pokal finalist: 1972, 1978.

References

External links
 

1948 births
Living people
German footballers
Germany international footballers
Bundesliga players
1. FC Saarbrücken players
1. FC Kaiserslautern players
Fortuna Düsseldorf players
Association football midfielders
Footballers from Saarland
West German footballers
People from Saarpfalz-Kreis
German football managers
West German football managers
1. FC Saarbrücken managers